is a railway station in the town of  Oguni, Yamagata Prefecture, Japan, operated by East Japan Railway Company (JR East).

Lines
Oguni Station is served by the Yonesaka Line, and is located 58.3 rail kilometers from the terminus of the line at Yonezawa Station.

Station layout
The station has one side platform and one island platform connected by a footbridge. The station has a Midori no Madoguchi staffed ticket office.

Platforms

History
Oguni Station opened on October 30, 1935. The station was absorbed into the JR East network upon the privatization of JNR on April 1, 1987.

Passenger statistics
In fiscal 2018, the station was used by an average of 116 passengers daily (boarding passengers only).

Surrounding area
Oguni Town Hall
Oguni Post Office
Oguni Police Station

See also
List of Railway Stations in Japan

References

External links

 JR East Station information 

Railway stations in Yamagata Prefecture
Yonesaka Line
Railway stations in Japan opened in 1935
Stations of East Japan Railway Company
Oguni, Yamagata